Francisco Javier 'Javi' Ruiz Bonilla (born 15 March 1980) is a Spanish retired footballer who played as a goalkeeper.

Football career
Born in Almería, Andalusia, Ruiz played for modest teams throughout the majority of his career (mostly in Catalonia), spending five seasons with FC Barcelona's second team. He also appeared for hometown's UD Almería in the second division (only five games out of 42 during his first and only campaign).

In January 2008, Ruiz was bought by RCD Espanyol from AD Adra as first-choice goalkeeper Carlos Kameni was away on international duty and backup Iñaki Lafuente injured. He left the club in July 2010, without any official appearances whatsoever.

In the 2010 autumn, Ruiz signed for Polideportivo Ejido in the third level. The following season he joined another side in that tier, CD Roquetas.

References

External links

1980 births
Living people
Footballers from Almería
Spanish footballers
Association football goalkeepers
Segunda División players
Segunda División B players
Tercera División players
FC Barcelona C players
FC Barcelona Atlètic players
Gimnàstic de Tarragona footballers
UD Almería players
CF Badalona players
UE Sant Andreu footballers
RCD Espanyol footballers
Polideportivo Ejido footballers
CD Roquetas footballers
Spain youth international footballers